The 2002 United States Senate election in Arkansas was held on November 5, 2002. Incumbent Republican U.S. Senator Tim Hutchinson ran for a second term, but was defeated by Democratic candidate Mark Pryor, whose father David had held the seat from 1979 to 1997. This was the only Senate seat in the 2002 midterm elections to switch from Republican to Democratic, and Hutchinson was the only incumbent Republican senator to lose reelection during that cycle.

Major candidates

Democratic 
 Mark Pryor, Arkansas Attorney General

Republican 

  Tim Hutchinson, incumbent U.S. Senator
  Jim Bob Duggar, State Representative

General election

Debates
Complete video of debate, October 14, 2002

Predictions

Results

See also 
 2002 United States Senate election

References 

Arkansas
2002
2002 Arkansas elections